Sue Hamilton (born May 13, 1945), also known as Sue Williams, is an American actress and model of Playboy magazine's Playmate of the Month for April 1965.

Early life and Playboy
Hamilton was born in Glendale, California and attended Glendale High School between 1957 and 1959. In 1964 Hamilton modeled for photographers  Bill and Melba Figge, whom she met through her sister who worked as an artist at Figge Studio, then located in Glendale. According to Melba Figge, quoted in an interview with Lindsay Sandham in 2005, "We sent the first [photo] in ... and Hugh Hefner said, 'She's really cute. We'd like to see your work. Hamilton, using the name Sue Williams, was the first of 48 Playboy centerfolds to be photographed by Figge Studio. According to Playboy, she was the first Playmate to have breast implants and the first who was less than five feet tall (152 cm).

Acting career
After appearing in Playboy, Sue Williams was signed immediately by American International Pictures and appeared in How to Stuff a Wild Bikini as "Peanuts", alongside other Playboy Playmates Marianne Gaba and Jo Collins.  She appeared in four more AIP movies released in between 1965 and 1966, credited as Sue Hamilton. Sue Hamilton appeared in nationally syndicated magazine articles promoting American International Pictures releases, including "Starlets Seek Natural Look" and "Use Makeup The Professional Way." Sue Hamilton also appeared in the "Super-face" print advertising campaign for "Sheer Magic" make-up, as did fellow AIP starlet Patti Chandler, to promote The Ghost in the Invisible Bikini and Fireball 500.

Filmography

See also

 List of people in Playboy 1960–1969

References

External links

1945 births
Living people
20th-century American actresses
Actresses from California
American film actresses
American television actresses
People from Glendale, California
1960s Playboy Playmates